The National Reined Cow Horse Association (NRCHA) is an equestrian organization in Pilot Point, Texas, United States, that began by promoting and staging Working cow horse events.

History 
The National Reined Cow Horse Association (formerly known as the California Reined Cow Horse Association) was founded in 1949. Its purpose is to continue the centuries long tradition process of training used by the vaqueros of California. The reined cow horse was a necessity in the 18th to 19th century on ranches. However, by the beginning of the 20th century, the need for this type of horse dissipated, especially during the Great Depression. Later, it was revived as a luxury sport, and the NRCHA now is the association that promotes and educates competitors about the sport.

Organization

Events 
 Celebration of Champions – the World Championship Show features the top ranked horses and riders.
 NRCHA Stakes – Four and five-year-olds by subscribed stallions compete in snaffle bit and hackamore events.
 NRCHA Derby – Four and five-year-old horses compete in several events, many had competed in snaffle bit futurities at age three.
 Hackamore Classic – For five year old horses. Must not have been shown in a bridle down the fence previously at a judged reined cow horse event.
 Snaffle Bit Futurity – Three year old horses compete in three separate events. The most popular event.
 The NRCHA also sanctions events by other associations, holds clinics, holds special events, and holds premium media events.

Hall of Fame 
The National Reined Cow Horse Association Hall of Fame includes a hall of fame for horses and people, as well as a hall of merit for people who have contributed outside the show pen. These inductees are tracked in a separate article.

Champions 

The National Reined Cow Horse Association awards their members yearly and those awards are tracked in a separate article.

See also
 Campdrafting
 Cutting (sport)
 Horse show
 Ranch sorting
 National Reining Horse Association
 National Reining Horse Association Champions and Awards
 National Reining Horse Association Hall of Fame
 National Reined Cow Horse Association Champions
 National Reined Cow Horse Association Hall of Fame
 Reining
 Stock horse
 Western riding
 Western saddle

References

External links 
 Official Site
 National Reined Cow Horse Association - NRCHA
 What is Reined Cow Horse aka Working Cow Horse (Photos & Video)

Western-style riding
Working stock horse sports
Reining
Horse showing and exhibition
Equestrian organizations
Equestrianism